Bamba Thialène is an arrondissement of Koumpentoum in Tambacounda Region in Senegal.

References 

Arrondissements of Senegal